Dan Ryan is an Australian netball player, coach, sports journalist and broadcaster. He is currently the head coach of the West Coast Fever in the Australian Suncorp Super Netball competition.

He was head coach of Manchester Thunder during the 2016 Netball Superleague season when they finished top of the table during the regular season and runners up in the grand final. He was subsequently head coach of Adelaide Thunderbirds for the 2017 and 2018 seasons. He was an assistant coach when Thunderbirds won the  2013 ANZ Championship and when Manchester Thunder won the 2019 Netball Superleague title. As a player, Ryan captained both the Victorian Cyclones and Australia Sonix men's netball teams. As a sports journalist and broadcaster, Ryan has worked for various organisations, including Network 10 and Sky Sports.

Early life, family and education
Ryan was raised in the Little River, Corio and Geelong areas of Victoria, Australia. He was one of four brothers. He was first inspired to play netball by his mother who played in local leagues. In 1992, at the age of 8, he began playing in Corio Netball Association competitions, initially in girls-only leagues. When he was 12 the association introduced mixed competitions. Between 2007 and 2011, Ryan attended RMIT University where he studied Communications and Journalism.

Playing career
At the age of 14, Ryan was selected to play for the Victorian Cyclones men's under-19 team and at 15 was playing for the senior team. In 2003, aged 18, he made his senior debut for Australia Sonix, the senior Australia men's team. Ryan went on to captain both the senior Victorian Cyclones and Australia Sonix men's teams. While still an active player, Ryan also began coaching. Between 2003 and 2006 he coached the senior netball team at Corio Community Sports Club While working in England, Ryan played for the Knights, a men's netball team. He made his Knights debut at the 2020 Big Showdown.

Sports Broadcaster
As a sports journalist and broadcaster, Ryan has worked for various organisations, including Network 10 and Sky Sports.

Coaching career

Adelaide Thunderbirds
Between 2012 and 2015, Ryan served an assistant coach at Adelaide Thunderbirds. In late 2011 he was approached by Thunderbirds head coach, Jane Woodlands-Thompson, and offered the job. He was subsequently a member of the Thunderbirds coaching staff when they won the 2013 ANZ Championship.  In 2013, while with Thunderbirds, Ryan also served as head coach for their Australian Netball League affiliate, Southern Force.  After a season away with Manchester Thunder, Ryan returned to Thunderbirds and served as head coach for the 2017 and 2018 seasons.

Manchester Thunder
In 2015 Ryan was appointed head coach of Manchester Thunder. During the 2016 Netball Superleague season he guided Thunder as they finished top of the table during the regular season and runners up in the grand final. He left Thunder to return to Adelaide Thunderbirds as head coach. Ryan re-joined Thunder for the 2019 season and served as an assistant coach to Karen Greig as Thunder won the title.

Northern Ireland
In November 2018 Ryan was appointed head coach of Northern Ireland. Ryan subsequently coached Northern Ireland at the 2019 Netball World Cup. In August 2019 it was announced that Ryan would continue to serve as Northern Ireland's head coach. 

Ryan stepped down from the role in April 2021.

Leeds Rhinos
It August 2019 Ryan was appointed head coach of Leeds Rhinos as part of their preparations for joining the Netball Superleague in 2021.

Ryan left the Rhinos after the 2021 Netball Superleague season in which the club qualified for the finals series in fourth place, to return to Australia.

West Coast Fever
Ryan was appointed head coach of the West Coast Fever upon his return to Australia in September 2021. Ryan replaced incoming Australia Diamonds coach Stacey Marinkovich.

In his first season, Ryan would lead the Fever to the club's first Suncorp Super Netball premiership, with the team defeating Melbourne Vixens 70–59.

Honours

Head coach
Manchester Thunder
Netball Superleague
Runners up: 2016
West Coast Fever
Suncorp Super Netball
Premiers: 2022

References

Living people
1984 births
Australian netball players
Australian netball coaches
Netball Superleague coaches
Suncorp Super Netball coaches
Adelaide Thunderbirds coaches
Manchester Thunder coaches
Australian expatriate netball people in England
Australian netball commentators
Australian sports journalists
Sky Sports presenters and reporters
Fox Sports (Australian TV network) people
Netball players from Victoria (Australia)
Sportspeople from Geelong
RMIT University alumni
Australian Netball League coaches